Dalian Zhongshan Park (in ) is a public park in the Shahekou District of Dalian, Liaoning Province, China, named after Sun Zhongshan, the first president of the Republic of China.  

Occupying  of land, the park was established in 1911 in honor of Prince Shotoku during the period that Japan leased Dalian from the Qing Dynasty government. It was renamed Zhongshan Park in 1946.

See also
Dalian
Sun Zhongshan
Zhongshan Parks in the world

References

External links

Parks in Liaoning
Tourist attractions in Liaoning
Dalian
Sun Yat-sen